Yuanansuchus is an extinct genus of mastodonsauroid temnospondyl. Fossils have been found from the Xinlingzhen formation in Yuan'an County, Hubei, China and date back to the Anisian stage of the Middle Triassic.

See also

 Prehistoric amphibian
 List of prehistoric amphibians

References

Capitosaurs
Triassic temnospondyls of Asia
Fossils of China
Fossil taxa described in 2005
Anisian life
Anisian genus first appearances
Anisian genus extinctions